Baron of Renfrew is a dignity held by the heir apparent to the British throne, currently Prince William, Duke of Rothesay. It was held by the Scottish heir apparent beginning in 1404. It is closely associated with the title Duke of Rothesay. An act of the Scottish Parliament passed in 1469 confirmed the pattern of succession. Renfrew, a town near Glasgow, is sometimes called the "cradle of the royal Stewarts".

In Scotland, barons hold feudal titles, not peerages: a Scottish lord of Parliament equates to an English or British baron. Some, however, claim that the Act of 1469 effectively elevated the Barony of Renfrew to the dignity of a peerage. Others suggest that the barony became a peerage upon the Union of the Crowns in 1603. Finally, some scholars argue that the uncertainty surrounding the text of the 1469 Act leaves the barony as only a feudal dignity, not a peerage dignity. The official position is given in Hansard (House of Lords – written answers) for 18 May 1999: "The Barony of Renfrew is not a peerage dignity at all; it is a feudal or minor barony of Scotland."

The title of Lord Renfrew was used by the traveling Prince of Wales, later King Edward VII, and by Prince Edward, Duke of Rothesay, later King Edward VIII and then Duke of Windsor, when he traveled in a private capacity or when he wished to pay visits 'incognito'.

In the early stages of her relationship with the then Prince of Wales Charles, Diana Spencer gave "Charles Renfrew" to her friends as the name of the man she was dating.

See also 
Colin Renfrew, Baron Renfrew of Kaimsthorn, known as "Lord Renfrew", a life peer whose title derives from his surname not from the barony of Renfrew

References

British monarchy
Baron
Charles III
William, Prince of Wales